Anthony J. Sattilaro (1931–1989) was an American physician and vegetarianism activist best known for promoting macrobiotics as a cancer cure. His views were criticized by medical experts as quackery.

Biography

Sattilaro was the chief executive officer of Methodist Hospital in South Philadelphia. He was diagnosed at the age 49 with prostate cancer with multiple bone metastases. In his book Recalled from Life (1982), he described how macrobiotics had cured his prostate cancer. He stated that a follow up examination revealed complete resolution of metastatic bone lesions. Sattilaro went on publicity tours and he appeared in magazines and talk shows. In Living Well Naturally (1984), he made the claim that a macrobiotic diet had put his prostate cancer into permanent remission.

In 1989, he died from prostate cancer that his books claimed he had been cured of. According to William T. Jarvis "he eventually died of his disease, but this fact was not mentioned in the macrobiotic press."

Publications
 Recalled by Life (Houghton Mifflin, 1982, 1989) 
 Living Well Naturally (Houghton Mifflin, 1984, 1985)

See also
 Hugh Faulkner (doctor)
 List of unproven and disproven cancer treatments

References

1931 births
1989 deaths
20th-century American physicians
Alternative cancer treatment advocates
Deaths from prostate cancer
Hospital administrators
Macrobiotic diet advocates
Pseudoscientific diet advocates
Vegetarianism activists